SNCF Connect, formerly OUI.sncf until January 25, 2022, is a subsidiary of SNCF selling passes and point-to-point tickets for rail travel around Europe. It has commercial links to major European rail operators including SNCF, Eurostar, Deutsche Bahn, and Thalys, and is made up of four independent companies in distinct geographical areas. As at 2003, It was the largest French electronic commerce website in volume. One quarter of French SNCF tickets are sold by this website.

In 2013 it expanded throughout Europe with 14 websites in six languages under the Voyages-sncf.com brand, incorporating the former Rail Europe Limited. Rail Europe Continental and TGV Europe. In December 2017 it was rebranded Oui.sncf.

In January 2022, the president of SNCF Voyageurs, Christophe Fanichet announced the merger of the OUI.sncf sales platform and the SNCF Assistant, which provides information on the state of traffic, through the creation of a new site and a new mobile application: SNCF Connect.

History
Voyages-sncf.com was founded as an internet travel agency website in France in June 2000. In July 2017, it purchased the business of Loco2. In December 2017, Voyages-sncf.com was rebranded as Oui.sncf.

In the United Kingdom

In 1893, the Chemin de Fer du Nord became the first French private railway to be represented in the UK, establishing an office at London Victoria station. Almost 20 years later, the Chemins de fer de Paris à Lyon et à la Méditerranée (PLM) opened an office at 179 Piccadilly, London.

In 1937 France nationalised its rail network and the Société Nationale des Chemins de Fer Français (SNCF) was created by the merger of the state railway company with five other principal operators. SNCF created French Railways, incorporating the UK operations of its predecessors.

In 1995 French Railways opened a larger public call centre in Leake Street (near Waterloo station) in London, and two years later acquired British Rail International. SNCF subsequently merged French Railways and British Rail International to form Rail Europe Limited.

In 2002 Rail Europe merged its head office operations from Piccadilly and the call centre from Leake Street into new premises in Kings Hill, Kent, and in December 2007 the travel centre in Piccadilly moved to new premises shared with VisitBritain at British Columbia House in Regent Street, London. In February 2012, the travel centre moved to 193 Piccadilly. 

In December 2013 Rail Europe rebranded itself as part of Voyages-sncf.com in the UK. In November 2015 the Voyages-sncf London travel centre closed; bookings can now be made online, via a mobile app, or through the Voyages-sncf.com call centre. The North American, Australian and World websites however still use the Rail Europe brand.

Rail Europe Chartered Operations

As well as selling and distributing tickets for SNCF and other European railways, until 2009 Rail Europe organised two chartered rail services in France. Operated by SNCF using standard French rolling stock, both services were aimed at the UK market and staffed by both French personnel (driver and guard) and English-speaking Rail Europe representatives ("Rail Travel Supervisors").

The Rail Europe Snowtrain
This chartered service operated between December or January and April to transport passengers directly to the ski resorts of the French Alps.

The journey took place in two stages; the Eurostar on a Friday from London or Ashford International to Paris, followed by a transfer to an overnight sleeper service composed of 10 Vu-84 Corail coaches with sleeping accommodation consisting of six berth "couchette" compartments. The train included a Bar/Disco coach, with disco lighting and DJ booth.
This overnight service called at Chambéry, Albertville, Aime la Plagne and Landry, terminating at Bourg St Maurice early Saturday morning. The return service departed from Bourg St Maurice on Saturday evenings, with passengers arriving by Eurostar in London or Ashford on Sunday morning. The Rail Europe Snowtrain was suspended in 2009 due to economic uncertainty.

British skiers wishing to travel by train to the French Alps during the winter can now instead take the Eurostar to Paris and change for high-speed or overnight services to stations like Chamonix, Bourg St Maurice, Briançon, Moûtiers and Megève. Eurostar also runs Direct Ski services during the ski season, calling at Moûtiers, Bourg St Maurice and Aime-la-Plagne, stations which serve ski resorts including Courchevel, Les Arcs, Tignes, Méribel, Aime la Plagne and Val d'Isère.

French Motorail
Motorail services carry cars and motorbikes using car transporters attached to the train. Operating from May to September, Rail Europe's French Motorail service was aimed at travellers wishing to take their cars to the South of France and onwards with a minimum amount of driving.

The train departed from Calais several times every week during the summer months, terminating at Nice (calling at Avignon and Frejus) and Narbonne (calling at Brive la Gaillarde and Toulouse.) The service was cancelled in 2009 due to economic uncertainty.

Those wishing to take their cars to France can now drive to Paris and pick up an 'Auto-Train' service, whereby cars are transported on overnight trains to Avignon, Bordeaux, Brive la Gaillarde, Fréjus/St Raphaël, Lyon, Marseille, Narbonne, Nice, Toulon and Toulouse. Unlike on the Motorail service, passengers may then either travel on the same route with a Lunéa sleeping-car ticket or on a different train such as a daytime TGV.

Rail Europe 4A
Created in 1995, Rail Europe 4A is a joint venture between SNCF and Swiss Federal Railways. The head office of Rail Europe 4A is located in Paris. The company has several local offices and General Sales Agents in Asia, Australasia, Africa and South America.

Rail Europe 4A is a leading distributor of point to point tickets and rail passes. In 2012, Rail Europe 4A launched the Rail Europe Connexion , a magazine and website for inspirational trips in Europe.

Rail Europe Continentale
This wholly owned subsidiary of the French Railways is responsible for the marketing and distribution of French domestic and international rail products in continental Europe. Rail Europe Continentale has its headquarters in Brussels and offices in Cologne, Milan, Geneva and Madrid.

Criticisms

Outages
The website saw several outages in its history, which were criticized by French medias.

Anti-competitive behavior
On 5 February 2009, SNCF was fined € 5 million by the French Conseil de la concurrence for "giving a preferential treatment to its subsidiary voyages-sncf.com, created with the American online travel agency Expedia". SNCF did not appeal the decision, but Expedia did.

See also
Oui.sncf has the status of travel agency, like its competitors:
Kombo (company)
Trainline EU

References

External links

2000 establishments in France
French travel websites
International rail transport
SNCF companies and subsidiaries
Travel and holiday companies of France
Internet properties established in 2000
Online travel agencies